Classix Nouveaux are an English new wave band. Though experiencing only moderate success in their native UK, most notably with their 1982 Top 20 hit "Is It a Dream", the band had number one hits in Poland, Portugal, Yugoslavia, Iceland, and other countries.

Formation
The break-up of X-Ray Spex triggered an advertisement placed in Melody Maker, searching for a new lead singer. Sal Solo (formerly with The News) answered the advertisement. Jak Airport and B.P. Hurding left X-Ray Spex to form Classix Nouveaux with Mik Sweeney and Sal Solo. Their first gig was on 25 August 1979 at London's Music Machine (which would later become the Camden Palace and is now called KOKO). With publicity growing for the band, their dramatic and heavily made-up image led to the music press associating them with the burgeoning New Romantic movement. Jak Airport was replaced by Gary Steadman during the same year.

In 1980, the band recorded a four track session for Capital Radio and one track, "Robot's Dance", was played regularly by DJ Nicky Horne. This got the interest of the United Artists record company (then part of the EMI group), but as negotiations dragged on, the band decided to release the track as their debut single on their own ESP label. They also performed for the first time on television on Thames TV in London. "Robot's Dance" spent eleven weeks on the UK Indie Chart, reaching #22, and became a popular alternative dance floor track. The group's second single, "Nasty Little Green Men", followed on 10 November 1980.

Career
In 1981, the first Classix Nouveaux album Night People was released along with two moderately successful singles "Guilty" and "Tokyo". Both singles reached the UK Top 75, and "Guilty" reached the Top 20 in Sweden and #25 in Australia. The album itself peaked at #66 in the UK. 

The second Classix Nouveaux album brought the band its biggest hits. La Verité was released in 1982 and the single release "Is It A Dream" brought the group its only British Top 20 hit, peaking at #11. Even though they were not part of the 'Blitz Kids' scene the band were often seen as a New Romantic act due to their stark image.

Their next single, "Because You're Young", peaked at #43 in the UK, while the album itself peaked at #44. After the tour supporting La vérité, Classix Nouveaux hired Finnish guitarist Jimi Sumen to replace Gary Steadman. Sumen had been a member of the support act at their Helsinki gig. The third and final Classix Nouveaux album, Secret, was released in 1983, produced by Alex Sadkin. The album, and its singles, were unsuccessful in the UK, but the band had number one hit singles in Poland with "Never Never Comes" and "Heart from the Start". The band toured and played to 25,000 people in Helsinki, but by now Solo was the only original member remaining after Jimi Sumen was replaced by Rick Driscoll and BP Hurding was replaced by Paul Turley.

Break-up
Classix Nouveaux broke up in 1985, by which time Sal Solo had already begun a solo career. He had a UK Top 20 hit with "San Damiano" which reached #15 in early 1985. He released an album, Heart and Soul, the same year, and further singles, "Music and You" (#52) and "Forever Be", but none of these were particularly successful. He went on to record and perform with the French space-rock and electronic band Rockets, before becoming heavily involved in Catholicism and releasing several Christian-oriented albums. 

Mik Sweeney moved to Los Angeles where he built fretless bass guitars and did studio session work; he currently lives in Ireland. Gary Steadman went on to join A Flock of Seagulls for their 1986 Dream Come True tour. Jimi Sumen became a record producer in Finland and released a number of solo works there.

The first Classix Nouveaux compilation album was released in 1997 via EMI Records and was reissued with a slightly different track listing in 2003. Beginning that same year, the band's original albums saw reissue on CD by Cherry Red Records. In 2005 River Records released The River Sessions, a live album recorded at Strathclyde University in 1982 and, in February 2021, all the band's singles and associated B-sides saw release as The Liberty Singles Collection, again via Cherry Red Records.

Reformation
In May 2021, the band surprised fans with a new single, which was a remake of "Inside Outside" from their first album. Since then they have announced a new album to be released in 2022 but have no live performances planned. On 29 May 2022, their single "Fix Your Eyes Up" charted at number 10 on The Heritage Chart (as broadcast with Mike Read on Talking Pictures TV).

Discography

Albums

Studio albums

Live albums

Compilation albums

Singles

Other charted songs

See also
List of Liberty Records artists
List of new wave artists and bands
O.T.T.

References

External links

English new wave musical groups
Musical groups established in 1979
Musical groups disestablished in 1985